Except where underlain by the Sixtymile Formation, Cambrian Tapeats Sandstone is typically the lowest geologic unit, about  thick, at its maximum, of the 5-member Tonto Group. It is famous for being the highly-resistant mostly-horizontal unit above the Great Unconformity expressed areally in the Grand Canyon of Arizona; also in other areas of Arizona and adjacent Nevada.

The Tapeats Sandstone is the highly erosion-resistant unit laid upon the Vishnu Basement Rocks in the central, parts of east, and parts of west Grand Canyon, Arizona. The unit comprises the 'base horizontal unit' of the platform around Granite Gorge (Inner Gorge) on the Colorado River, and because of its hardness, creates the Tonto Platform upon which the slope-forming, Bright Angel Shale, (extensive, and distinctively soft drab-greenish), and above which low cliffs of Muav Limestone lie.

The Tapeats unit is the basal unit of a typical marine transgression series of sandstone-(conglomerate)-shale-limestone, all part of a paleo sea, initially adjacent to land, the source of the Tapeats rocks-(conglomerates) and sand; (a regressing sequence has the reverse order). The Tapeats Sea at the late Cambrian ceased to deposit more Muav Limestone, and a period of erosion ensued, a deposition unconformity.

The Tapeats Sandstone was laid upon the Vishnu Basement Rocks, after an unconformity of erosion, the Great Unconformity. Besides the erosion unconformity, the Grand Canyon Supergroup of the basement rocks are also at an angular unconformity, being an 7-member sequence tilted at 45 degrees.

The horizontal Tonto Platform has hiking trails that cross it from the South Rim to North Rim, Grand Canyon for instance. The extensive Tonto Trail lies on parts of the Tapeats Sandstone, and the platform on the south side of Granite Gorge.

Geologic sequence
The units of the Tonto Group:
 5 – Frenchman Mountain Dolostone
 4 – Muav Limestone
 3 – Bright Angel Shale
 2 – Tapeats Sandstone (start of transgression series)
 1 – Sixtymile Formation

Gallery Tapeats Sandstone
Examples of the deposition unconformity of time (550–800 million yrs), the Great Unconformity. The Tapeats approximately 200 ft thick.

See also

 Geology of the Grand Canyon area
 Great Unconformity
 Sauk sequence

References

Further reading
 Blakey, Ron and Wayne Ranney, Ancient Landscapes of the Colorado Plateau, Grand Canyon Association (publisher), 2008, 176 pages, 
 Chronic, Halka. Roadside Geology of Arizona, Mountain Press Publishing Co., 1983, 23rd printing, pp. 229–232, 
 Lucchitta, Ivo, Hiking Arizona's Geology, 2001, Mountaineers's Books,

External links

 Anonymous (2011a) Tonto Group, Stratigraphy of the Parks of the Colorado Plateau. U.S. Geological Survey, Reston, Virginia.
 Anonymous (2011b) Tapeats Sandstone, Stratigraphy of the Parks of the Colorado Plateau. U.S. Geological Survey, Reston, Virginia.
 Anonymous (2011c) Bright Angel Shale, Stratigraphy of the Parks of the Colorado Plateau. U.S. Geological Survey, Reston, Virginia.
 Anonymous (2011c) Muav Limestone, Stratigraphy of the Parks of the Colorado Plateau. U.S. Geological Survey, Reston, Virginia.
 Brandriss, M. (2004) Angular unconformity between Proterozoic and Cambrian rocks, Grand Canyon, Arizona. GeoDIL, A Geoscience Digital Image Library, University of North Dakota, Grand Forks, North Dakota.
 Mathis, A., and C. Bowman (2007) The Grand Age of Rocks: The Numeric Ages for Rocks Exposed within Grand Canyon, Grand Canyon National Park, Arizona.'', National Park Service, Grand Canyon National Park, Arizona.
 Rowland, S. (nda) Frenchman Mountain Great Unconformity site. Department of Geoscience, University of Nevada, Las Vegas, Nevada.
 Rowland, S. (ndb) Geologic Map of Frenchman Mountain. Department of Geoscience, University of Nevada, Las Vegas, Nevada.
 Rowland, S. (ndc) Frenchman Mountain and the Great Unconformity. Department of Geoscience, University of Nevada, Las Vegas, Nevada.
 Share, J.  (2102a) The Great Unconformity of the Grand Canyon and the Late Proterozoic-Cambrian Time Interval: Part I - Defining It.
 Share, J.  (2102a) The Great Unconformity and the Late Proterozoic-Cambrian Time Interval: Part II – The Rifting of Rodinia and the "Snowball Earth" Glaciations That Followed.
 Timmons, M. K. Karlstrom, and C. Dehler (1999) Grand Canyon Supergroup Six Unconformities Make One Great Unconformity A Record of Supercontinent Assembly and Disassembly. Boatman's Quarterly Review. vol. 12, no. 1, pp. 29–32.
 Timmons, S. S. (2003) Learning to Read the Pages of a Book (Grand Canyon Geology Training Manual), National Park Service, Grand Canyon National Park, Arizona.

Sandstone formations of the United States
Natural history of the Grand Canyon
Geologic formations of Arizona
Geologic formations of Nevada
Cambrian Arizona
Cambrian Nevada
Cambrian System of North America